Daniel Pineda Contreras (born 19 September 1985) is a Chilean track and field athlete who competes in the long jump. He holds the Chilean national record in the event with his personal best jump of eight metres. In 2011 he was third at the South American Championships in Athletics, then won the gold medal at the 2011 Pan American Games after the original winner was disqualified.

Biography
Born in Talcahuano, Concepción, Pineda won his first international long jumping title at the 2002 South American Youth Championships in Athletics. In addition to his long jump gold medal, he also won silver medals in the 4×100 metres relay and sprint medley relay, as well as placing fifth individually over 100 metres.

After a break from athletics, he moved to the Chilean capital to train with Club Atlético Santiago in 2006 and appeared at the top level of senior competition in 2007. He jumped a personal best of 7.59 m in La Paz in June and a week later he placed eighth in the long jump at the 2007 South American Championships, where he was also a relay runner for Chile in both the 100 m and 400 m events. He ended the year by winning the Chilean long jump title in Santiago de Chile. He retained it the following season, in which he also ran a 100 m best of 10.63 seconds and finished tenth at the 2008 Ibero-American Championships in Athletics. He only competed in Santiago in 2010, but still managed to win at the Chilean Championships.

Pineda made much progression in the 2010 season: he had a jump of 7.76 m in Medellín in April then broke the Chilean record at the national championships the following month, winning his fourth straight title with a clearance of 7.97 m. At the end of May, he edged this a centimetre further in La Paz. He did not reach this form at the 2010 Ibero-American Championships in Athletics as he took tenth place for a second time running with a best jump of 7.33 m. Pineda was a guest at the Colombian championships in 2011 and improved his national mark to eight metres for the first time. Nine years after his victory at youth level, he won his first senior medal at the 2011 South American Championships in Athletics, taking the bronze medal. He made his debut at a world level event at the 2011 Summer Universiade and came twelfth in the long jump.

At the 2011 Pan American Games in Guadalajara he delivered one of the best performances of his career: he jumped 7.97 m in the final to finish runner-up behind Venezuela's Víctor Castillo. However, Pineda was upgraded from the silver medal to the gold as Castillo tested positive for banned substances. He currently works as a sports teacher and athletics trainer at Colegio San Benito, in Santiago.

Doping ban 
Pineda was given a two-year ban for "tampering". The ban ran from 5 March 2013 to 4 March 2015.

Achievements

References

External links

Living people
1985 births
Chilean male long jumpers
Doping cases in athletics
Chilean sportspeople in doping cases
Pan American Games medalists in athletics (track and field)
Athletes (track and field) at the 2011 Pan American Games
Athletes (track and field) at the 2015 Pan American Games
Athletes (track and field) at the 2019 Pan American Games
People from Talcahuano
Pan American Games gold medalists for Chile
Medalists at the 2011 Pan American Games